Vietnam is a dynamic developing economy with a relatively high growth rate. The energy sector plays a key role in promoting the country's socio-economic development. Vietnam has a diverse energy fuel resource of various types such as coal, natural gas, petroleum, hydropower and renewables such as solar and wind energy. The country has recently been successful in renewable energy deployment, especially solar and wind power development. Coal has been the key power generation source since 2018. Coal accounted for about 30% of installed capacity and 47% of electricity generation in 2021  The high use of coal makes Vietnam an increasingly important emitter of carbon dioxide, contributing to climate change.

Total primary energy supply (domestic, import) by type 

Table 1: Progress of primary energy supply between 2000‑2015 in kilotonnes of oil equivalent (KTOE)

Coal 
Data of the Ministry of Industry and Trade (MOIT), 10 months of 2018 coal production was estimated at 34.35 million tons, up 10% over the same period in 2017, of which clean coal output of Vinacomin (TKV) was 29.6 million tons, up 10.9% over the same period last year. By the end of 2018, TKV's coal production reached 36.95 million tons. In 2019, TKV aimed to produce 40 million tons while consumption was up to 42 million tons, exceeding 2 million tons compared to production.

On 2019-04-09, the amount of raw coal produced by this group reached over 10.7 million tons (of which 10.5 million tons were exported). To meet the above figure, TKV had to import another 1.2 million tons of coal to mix, while reducing its inventory to 6.2 million tons of coal.

Table 2: Vietnam's coal import volume from 2014 to 2017 (tons): 

The total volume of coal imported into Vietnam from 2014 to 2017 reached nearly 38 million tons and has an increasing trend. In terms of markets, Australia, Indonesia and China are the three largest coal supply markets for Vietnam. According to the statistics of the General Department of Vietnam Customs, in the year of 2020, Vietnam imported 54,8 million tons of coal, worth US$3,7 billion.

Table 3: Vietnam's coal balance in 2017 (million tons): 

It is forecasted that in the future, domestic coal resources will not meet the demand for consumption in general, electricity production in particular and must be imported in huge quantities ... (2020: 86 million tons, 2025: 121 million tons and 2030: 156 million tons). Mr. Sabyasachi Mishra, mineral sales manager at Tata International, predicts that Vietnam's annual coal imports will increase from 20 million tons to 30 million tons in the next one or several years, especially when domestic coal reserves are downward trend.

Oil 
According to the report of Petrovietnam (PVN), the total production of oil exploitation in 2017 reached 25.41 million tons, exceeding 1.60 million tons of oil equivalent compared to the Government plan assigned at the beginning of the year, but exploration increased reserves to only 4 million tons. In particular, oil exploitation reached 15.52 million tons, exceeding 1.32 million tons.

In 2018, the oil production reached nearly 14 million tons (of which, the domestic oil production was about 11.3 million tons), down from the level of over 15.52 million tons in 2017.

According to government statistics, in the period 2012–2017 crude oil exports were always more than imports, with an average export volume of 8.3 million tons/year, while imports averaged only about 750 thousand tons/year.

In 2018, the whole country exported 3.96 million tons of crude oil, down 41.8% from 2017 and less than half of the annual exports of crude oil in the period of 2012–2017. At the same time, imports reached 5.17 million tons, more than 4 times the figure of 1.18 million tons in 2017 and 7 times more than the annual import figure for the period 2012–2017.

In January and February 2019 the whole country imported more than 1.462 million tons of crude oil (worth US$635.4 million), an increase of more than 16 times in volume and 14 times in value from the same period in 2018.  The reason for the sharp increase is the oil demand for production by the Nghi Sơn Refinery.

Oil production in many wells is declining naturally, due to exploitation for too long. In addition, the increase in reserves is so low that from 2018 to 2025, oil production will decrease steadily every year by 10% – equivalent to more than 2 million tons. Lack of capital is the main reason that PVN has not been able to boost oil and gas exploration activities in the past years to increase reserves. The increased output to compensate for the exploitation has reduced to a worrying level, affecting the sustainable development of Vietnam's oil and gas industry. Only a few years from 2018, the total oil and gas production will be only 1/3 of the current production.

Natural gas 

According to the 2018 report of the MOIT, production of natural gas has increased gradually from 2011 to 2016, but has decreased slightly in 2017 when only reached 9.8 billion m3.

First half of 2018, natural gas exploitation was estimated at 5.3 billion m3, up 1%; liquefied gas was estimated at 437.6 thousand tons, up 18.5% compared to the same period in 2017. Natural gas production was likely to not increase in 2018 when output by the end of 10 months of 2018 reaches 8.39 billion m3. That shows the overall picture of the mining industry in general, the gas industry in particular is increasingly gaining development, basically meeting the requirements, there is no shortage of supply.However, after 2020, Vietnam's natural gas fields will decline and it is necessary to import tens of billions of cubic meters of liquefied petroleum gas (LPG) to supply power plants. Current gas fields are sufficient to meet 100% of domestic demand, but will begin to decline from 2022. Therefore, in the near future, Vietnam will have to import LPG to serve domestic demand, especially electricity production in gas power plants.

Renewables 

Vietnam has the ASEAN largest offshore wind power potential,with over 470 GW technical potential in 200 km of the coast, about 6 times of the country's installed capacity of 2022. This offers huge opportunties for meeting domestic demand as well as exporting other countries such as Singapore.

Hydro-power 

According to theoretical calculations, the total hydro-power capacity of the country is about 35,000 MW, of which 60% is concentrated in the North, 27% is distributed in the Central and 13% in the South. Technical potential (potentially feasible to exploit) is about 26,000 MW, equivalent to nearly 970 planned projects, can annually produce more than 100 billion kWh, of which small hydroelectricity comes in particular 800 projects, with a total power of about 15–20 billion kWh/year.

In 2017, reports said that large hydro-power power plants with capacity of over 100 MW were almost fully exploited. Plants with favorable locations and low investment costs have also been constructed. Remaining in the near future, small capacity hydro-power projects will be invested for exploitation.

According to the assessment, Vietnam's small hydro-power potential is about 4,000 MW, of which the source with a capacity of 100 kW-30 MW accounts for 93–95%, while the type of source with a capacity of under 100 kW only accounts for 5 – 7%, with total capacity over 200 MW.

As of 2018, there were 818 hydro-power project power plants in the whole country with total installed capacity of 23,182 MW. In which, 385 plants with the total installed capacity of 18,564 MW have been put into operation, 143 projects were being constructed with a total installed capacity of 1,848 MW and 290 investment projects with a total installed capacity of 2,770 MW. There are many dams and hydro-power stations in Vietnam.

Total final energy consumption (by sector, by type) 
Table : Total Final Consumption (TFC) by source – Viet Nam (KTOE) 

In the sectorial structure in final energy consumption figure in 2006, residential and industrial sectors took the largest percentage part, respectively 41% and 32%. However, compared to 2015 data, the industrial sector had the highest share, correctively 43% and the residential section had a reduction to 27% of energy demand. The energy consumption percentage of the transportation sector change from only 20% in 2006 to 23% in 2015.  

For the final energy consumption classified by type of fuel, the amount of electricity consumed increases significantly from 2006 to 2015. Coal consumption, biomass, oil products remain the same from 2010 to 2013. At that time, the growth rate declined significantly, from 7.6% in 2007 to 1.3% in 2012, then gradually increased to 3.5% in 2015.

Energy intensity
In 2017 the energy intensity of Vietnam's economy (E/G) was 5.7 MJ per year-2010 US$, above the world average of 5.2. That was also higher than other ASEAN countries, for example Thailand (5.3) and Indonesia (3.5). This reflects the high level of energy use associated with Vietnam's industrialization and its heavy reliance on coal.

Energy efficiency in economic development is expressed through these indicators: Energy intensity, GDP, Final energy consumption, Power consumption, Power intensity, shown in Table:

Table : Energy efficiency in economic development:

Through the data in Table 5, it can be seen that the energy intensity has decreased sharply from 568 kgOE in 2000 to less than half, about 260 kgOE in 2015 – 2018, while the power intensity still tends to gradually increasing over the past two decades, from more than 500 kWh (2000) to nearly 700 – 800 kWh (2015–2018).

Table 6: Energy intensity and power intensity of some countries:

Emissions from energy sector 
After joining the UNFCCC, Vietnam conducts greenhouse gas inventories through the development of the National Notice (NC) and the biennial update report for UNFCCC (BUR). To date, Vietnam has completed the construction of the first and second NCs, BUR1 (2014) and BUR2 (2017).

Vietnam's GHG emissions have been increasing quickly, with the main contributor being fossil fuel combustion which accounted for about 60% of greenhouse gas emissions in 2014. In 2019 Vietnam was the world's 22nd largest CO2 emitter from fuel combustion and the 3rd largest in the Association of Southeast Asian Nations (ASEAN).

In the energy sector in Vietnam, GHG is mainly emitted from fuel combustion and dispersal in the process of fuel extraction and transportation. The total amount of GHG emissions in the energy sector in 2013 was 151.4 million tons CO2e. In particular, fuel combustion activities are common in the electricity production, industry and construction, transportation, agriculture / forestry / fisheries and a number of other sectors. This is a major activity of GHG production, accounting for 86.1% of the total GHG emissions nationwide. In particular, with the consumption of large amounts of fuel, accounting for about 60% of total fuel consumption, transportation activities also emit a significant amount of GHG into the atmosphere. The transportation sector emits about 30 million tons of CO2e, the emissions increase rapidly over the years, more than doubling from 12.58 million tons of e (in 2000) to 29.7 million tons of e (in 2013). Meanwhile, road traffic emissions accounted for 90.9%, railway, waterway and airway traffic emissions accounted for nearly 10%, the civil aviation industry also had significant and increasing GHG emissions.

According to research from the International Energy Agency (IEA), the process of using energy causes GHG emissions to account for the largest proportion, about 60% of global GHG emissions annually. Also, Vietnam's GHG emissions will increase 2.7 times and 4.6 times in 2020 and 2030 compared to 2010 emissions. One of the main measures to reduce GHG emissions in the industry energy is implementing energy saving and effective use. Other measures include carbon pricing, which was legalized in the form of emission trading scheme in the Law on Environmental Protection 2020.

Table 7:  Trends of emissions/removals among inventory cycles

See also
 Economy of Vietnam
 Renewable energy in Vietnam
 Nuclear energy in Vietnam, two planned NPPs
 List of gas power plants in Vietnam
 List of power stations in Vietnam

References